"Mlađe slađe" ("Younger, Sweeter") is a song recorded by Bosnian pop recording artist Selma Bajrami and Bosnian American artist Enela Palavra. It was released on 9 October 2015 as a non-album single.

The music video was produced by the label IDJTunes and released along with the song.

References

External links
Mlađe slađe at Discogs

2016 singles
2016 songs
Pop-folk songs